Bailey Earl Clark (November 6, 1907 – January 16, 1938) was an outfielder in Major League Baseball who played from 1927 through 1934, for the Boston Braves (1927–33) and St. Louis Browns (1934). He was born in Washington, D.C.

Clark set the major league record for putouts by an outfielder in a 9-inning game, with twelve on May 10, 1929. The feat has only been equalled twice; by Lyman Bostock in 1977, and by Jacoby Ellsbury in 2009.

In an eight-year career, Clark posted an average of .291 (240-for-826) with four home runs and 81 runs batted in in 293 games, including 122 runs scored and a .324 on-base percentage.

Clark died at the age of 30 in 1938, when his automobile collided with a streetcar in Washington, D.C.

References

External links
, or Retrosheet
 

1907 births
1938 deaths
Major League Baseball outfielders
Boston Braves players
St. Louis Browns players
Baseball players from Washington, D.C.
Road incident deaths in Washington, D.C.